Derasat, or the Bahrain Center for Strategic, International & Energy Studies (دِراسات),  is a government-sponsored think tank in Bahrain. Its name is the Arabic word for "studies". It was created in 2009 by King Hamad bin Isa Al Khalifa to make a contribution to the country's public policy decision-making.

Leadership

The Board of Trustees was renewed at the same time by royal decree. As of 2015, the chairman had been Khalid Ibrahim Al Fadhala.

As of May 2021, Hamad Ebrahim Al Abdullah was Derasat's Executive Director, after succeeding Katadah Abdul Hameed Zaman in 2020. The previous Executive Director was Khalid Mohamed Al Ruwaihi. As of 2020, Omar Al-Ubaydli was the organization's Director of Research.

See also
 Arab Center for Research and Policy Studies
 Dubai Economic Council
 Gulf Research Center
 Bahrain Centre for Studies and Research

Notes

External link
 Official website: derasat.org.bh

Think tanks based in Bahrain
Research institutes in Bahrain